One Northern Summer is a Canadian documentary television miniseries which aired on CBC Television from 1971 to 1977.

Premise
This series featured both animal and human life in the Arctic. Seals around the Pribiloff Islands were the subject of one episode, and the Northern Games second year in Inuvik was featured in another.

Scheduling
This half-hour series was broadcast Wednesdays at 4:30 p.m. (Eastern) from 29 December 1971 to 7 June 1972. It was rebroadcast at various dates and times in 1972, 1973, 1974 and 1977.

References

External links
 

CBC Television original programming
1971 Canadian television series debuts
1977 Canadian television series endings